This is a list of the Russian moth species of the superfamilies Pyraloidea, Cimelioidea, Calliduloidae and Drepanoidea. It also acts as an index to the species articles and forms part of the full List of moths of Russia.

Pyraloidea

Pyralidae
Achroia grisella (Fabricius, 1794)
Acrobasis birgitella (Roesler, 1975)
Acrobasis consociella (Hübner, [1813])
Acrobasis curvella (Ragonot, 1893)
Acrobasis cymindella (Ragonot, 1893)
Acrobasis cynicella (Christoph, 1881)
Acrobasis encaustella Ragonot, 1893
Acrobasis flavifasciella Yamanaka, 1990
Acrobasis frankella (Roesler, 1975)
Acrobasis glaucella Staudinger, 1859
Acrobasis injunctella (Christoph, 1881)
Acrobasis obrutella (Christoph, 1881)
Acrobasis obtusella (Hübner, 1796)
Acrobasis porphyrella (Duponchel, 1836)
Acrobasis rufilimbalis (Wileman, 1911)
Acrobasis rufizonella Ragonot, 1887
Acrobasis sodalella Zeller, 1848
Acrobasis squalidella Christoph, 1881
Acrobasis tokiella (Ragonot, 1893)
Actenia incalidalis (Hübner, [1825])
Actenia serratalis Hampson, 1900
Aglossa caprealis (Hübner, [1809])
Aglossa dimidiata (Haworth, 1810)
Aglossa pinguinalis (Linnaeus, 1758)
Ancylodes dealbatella (Erschoff, 1874)
Ancylodes pallens Ragonot, 1887
Ancylosis albicosta (Staudinger, 1870)
Ancylosis anarchica Roesler, 1970
Ancylosis anguinosella Zeller, 1848
Ancylosis cinnamomella (Duponchel, 1836)
Ancylosis citrinella (Ragonot, 1887)
Ancylosis dryadella (Ragonot, 1887)
Ancylosis dumetella Ragonot, 1887
Ancylosis faustinella (Zeller, 1867)
Ancylosis flammella Ragonot, 1887
Ancylosis griseomixtella Ragonot, 1887
Ancylosis lacteicostella (Ragonot, 1887)
Ancylosis leucocephala (Staudinger, 1879)
Ancylosis lividella (Ragonot, 1887)
Ancylosis maculifera Staudinger, 1870
Ancylosis monostictella (Ragonot, 1887)
Ancylosis nervosella (Zerny, 1914)
Ancylosis nigripunctella (Staudinger, 1879)
Ancylosis oblitella (Zeller, 1848)
Ancylosis pallida (Staudinger, 1870)
Ancylosis plumbatella (Ragonot, 1888)
Ancylosis pyrethrella (Herrich-Schäffer, 1860)
Ancylosis rhodochrella (Herrich-Schäffer, 1855)
Ancylosis roscidella (Eversmann, 1844)
Ancylosis sabulosella (Staudinger, 1879)
Ancylosis samaritanella (Zeller, 1867)
Ancylosis sareptella (Herrich-Schäffer, 1861)
Ancylosis syrtella (Ragonot, 1887)
Ancylosis turaniella Ragonot, 1901
Ancylosis urbicella (Erschoff, 1874)
Ancylosis xylinella (Staudinger, 1870)
Ancylosoma substratellum (Christoph, 1877)
Anerastia korbi Caradja, 1910
Anerastia lotella (Hübner, [1813])
Aphomia curvicostella (Zerny, 1914)
Aphomia foedella (Zeller, 1839)
Aphomia sociella (Linnaeus, 1758)
Aphomia zelleri de Joannis, 1932
Aphyletes nigrisparsella (Ragonot, 1887)
Apomyelois bistriatella (Hulst, 1887)
Apomyelois ceratoniae (Zeller, 1839)
Apomyelois cognata (Staudinger, 1871)
Apomyelois subcognata (Ragonot, 1887)
Asalebria florella (Mann, 1862)
Asalebria subrubella Amsel, 1970
Asalebria venustella (Ragonot, 1887)
Asarta aethiopella (Duponchel, 1837)
Assara korbi (Caradja, 1910)
Assara terebrella (Zincken, 1818)
Auxacia bilineella (Ragonot, 1887)
Bradyrrhoa gilveolella (Treitschke, 1832)
Cadra calidella (Guenée, 1845)
Cadra cautella (Walker, 1863)
Cadra figulilella (Gregson, 1871)
Cadra furcatella (Herrich-Schäffer, 1849)
Canarsia vittatella (Ragonot, 1887)
Catastia kistrandella Opheim, 1963
Catastia marginea ([Denis & Schiffermüller], 1775)
Catastia umbrosella Erschoff, 1877
Ceroprepes fusconebulella Yamanaka & Kirpichnikova, 2000
Christophia ectypella (Ragonot, 1888)
Cnephidia kenteriella Ragonot, 1892
Conobathra repandana (Fabricius, 1798)
Conobathra tumidana ([Denis & Schiffermüller], 1775)
Copamyntis martimella Kirpichnikova & Yamanaka, 2002
Corcyra cephalonica (Stainton, 1866)
Cremnophila auranticiliella Ragonot, 1893
Cremnophila sedakovella (Eversmann, 1851)
Cryptoblabes bistriga (Haworth, 1811)
Cryptoblabes loxiella Ragonot, 1887
Datanoides fasciata Butler, 1878
Dectocera tristis Kirpichnikova & Yamanaka, 1999
Dioryctria abietella ([Denis & Schiffermüller], 1775)
Dioryctria pryeri Ragonot, 1893
Dioryctria schuetzeella Fuchs, 1899
Dioryctria simplicella Heinemann, 1863
Dioryctria sylvestrella (Ratzeburg, 1840)
Eccopisa effractella Zeller, 1848
Ectomyelois pyrivorella (Matsumura, 1900)
Elegia similella (Zincken, 1818)
Ematheudes punctella (Treitschke, 1833)
Ematheudes varicella Ragonot, 1887
Emmalocera gensanalis South, 1901
Endotricha admirabilis Kirpichnikova, 2003
Endotricha costaemaculalis Christoph, 1881
Endotricha flammealis ([Denis & Schiffermüller], 1775)
Endotricha flavofascialis (Bremer, 1864)
Endotricha icelusalis Walker, 1859
Endotricha kuznetzovi Whalley, 1963
Endotricha olivacealis (Bremer, 1864)
Endotricha portialis Walker, 1859
Endotricha valentis Kirpichnikova, 2003
Ephestia animella Nupponen & Junnilainen, 1998
Ephestia elutella (Hübner, 1796)
Ephestia kuehniella Zeller, 1879
Ephestia parasitella Staudinger, 1859
Ephestia welseriella (Zeller, 1848)
Epidauria strigosa (Staudinger, 1879)
Epischidia caesariella (Ragonot, 1901)
Epischidia fulvostrigella (Eversmann, 1844)
Epischnia adultella (Zeller, 1848)
Epischnia ampliatella Heinemann, 1864
Epischnia cretaciella Mann, 1869
Epischnia cuculliella Ragonot, 1887
Epischnia eximia Kirpichnikova, 2001
Epischnia glyphella Ragonot, 1887
Epischnia illotella Zeller, 1839
Epischnia juldusella Caradja, 1916
Epischnia lydella (Lederer, 1865)
Epischnia mongolica Amsel, 1954
Epischnia prodromella (Hübner, [1799])
Epischnia zophodiella Ragonot, 1887
Episcythrastis tabidella (Mann, 1864)
Episcythrastis tetricella ([Denis & Schiffermüller], 1775)
Etiella zinckenella (Treitschke, 1832)
Etielloides bipartitellus (Leech, 1889)
Etielloides kogii Yamanaka, 1998
Etielloides sejunctella (Christoph, 1881)
Eucarphia vinetella (Fabricius, 1787)
Eurhodope cirrigerella (Zincken, 1818)
Eurhodope pseudodichromella Yamanaka, 1980
Eurhodope rosella (Scopoli, 1763)
Euzophera afflictella Ragonot, 1887
Euzophera albicostalis Hampson, 1903
Euzophera alpherakyella Ragonot, 1887
Euzophera batangensis Caradja, 1939
Euzophera bigella (Zeller, 1848)
Euzophera cinerosella (Zeller, 1839)
Euzophera costivittella Ragonot, 1887
Euzophera formosella (Rebel, 1910)
Euzophera fuliginosella (Heinemann, 1865)
Euzophera lunulella (Costa, [1836])
Euzophera pinguis (Haworth, 1811)
Euzophera rubricetella (Herrich-Schäffer, 1855)
Euzophera tetragramma (Rebe1, 1910)
Euzopherodes oberleae Roes1er, 1973
Galleria mellonella (Linnaeus, 1758)
Glyptoteles leucacrinella Zeller, 1848
Gymnancyla barbatella Erschoff, 1874
Gymnancyla canella ([Denis & Schiffermüller], 1775)
Gymnancyla craticulella (Ragonot, 1887)
Gymnancyla hornigi (Lederer, 1852)
Hoeneodes sinensis (Caradja, 1937)
Homoeosoma calcellum Ragonot, 1887
Homoeosoma candefactellum Ragonot, 1887
Homoeosoma caradjellum Roesler, 1965
Homoeosoma heidiellum Roesler, 1967
Homoeosoma inustellum Ragonot, 1884
Homoeosoma matsumurellum Shibuya, 1927
Homoeosoma nebulellum ([Denis & Schiffermüller], 1775)
Homoeosoma nimbella (Duponchel, 1837)
Homoeosoma punctistrigellum Ragonot, 1888
Homoeosoma sinuellum (Fabricius, 1794)
Homoeosoma subalbatellum (Mann, 1864)
Hypochalcia ahenella ([Denis & Schiffermüller], 1775)
Hypochalcia caminariella Erschoff, 1877
Hypochalcia castanella Ragonot, 1887
Hypochalcia decorella (Hübner, [1810])
Hypochalcia dignella (Hübner, 1796)
Hypochalcia disjunctella Zeller, 1848
Hypochalcia griseoaenella Ragonot, 1887
Hypochalcia lignella (Hübner, 1796)
Hypochalcia propinquella (Eversmann, 1842)
Hypochalcia staudingeri Ragonot, 1887
Hyporatasa allotriella (Herrich-Schäffer, 1855)
Hypotia colchicalis (Herrich-Schäffer, 1851)
Hypotia concatenalis Lederer, 1858
Hypotia massilialis (Duponchel, 1832)
Hypsopygia costalis (Fabricius, 1775)
Hypsopygia fulvocilialis (Duponchel, 1832)
Hypsopygia glaucinalis (Linnaeus, 1758)
Hypsopygia iwamotoi Kirpichnikova & Yamanaka, 1995
Hypsopygia placens (Butler, 1879)
Hypsopygia regina (Butler, 1879)
Hypsopygia rubidalis ([Denis & Schiffermüller], 1775)
Hypsotropa limbella Zeller, 1848
Hypsotropa solipunctella Ragonot, 1901
Hypsotropa unipunctella Ragonot, 1888
Insalebria kozhantshikovi Filipjev, 1924
Insalebria serraticornella (Zeller, 1839)
Isauria dilucidella (Duponchel, 1836)
Jacutscia strigata Hampson, 1930
Keradere tengstroemiella (Erschoff, 1874)
Khorassania compositella (Treitschke, 1835)
Khorassania imitatella (Ragonot, 1893)
Lamoria anella ([Denis & Schiffermüller], 1775)
Lamoria melanophlebia Ragonot, 1888
Lamoria ruficostella Ragonot, 1888
Lepidogma atribasalis (Hampson, 1900)
Lista ficki (Christoph, 1881)
Lymphia chalybella (Eversmann, 1844)
Macalla amica (Butler, 1879)
Macalla amurensis Hampson, 1900
Magadania cognata Kirpichnikova & Yamanaka, 2001
Megasis dentinella (Bremer, 1864)
Megasis ragonoti Leraut, 2003
Megasis rippertella (Zeller, 1839)
Merulempista cingillella (Zeller, 1846)
Merulempista nigrolineatella Shibuya, 1927
Merulempista ophthalmicella (Christoph, 1881)
Merulempista patriciella Zeller, 1867
Mimopolyocha obscurella (Matsumura, 1911)
Monotonia straminella (Zerny, 1914)
Morosaphycita maculata (Staudinger, 1876)
Myelois circumvoluta (Fourcroy, 1785)
Myelois fuscicostella Mann, 1861
Myelopsis rufimaculella Yamanaka, 1993
Myrlaea marmorata (Alphéraky, 1876)
Nephopterix angustella (Hübner, 1796)
Nephopterix nocticolorella Ragonot, 1887
Noctuides melanophia Staudinger, 1892
Nyctegretis lineana (Scopoli, 1786)
Nyctegretis triangulella Ragonot, 1901
Oligochroa bilineatella (Inoue, 1859)
Oncocera combustella (Herrich-Schäffer, 1855)
Oncocera faecella (Zeller, 1839)
Oncocera griseosparsella Ragonot, 1893
Oncocera semirubella (Scopoli, 1763)
Orthaga achatina Butler, 1878
Orthaga olivacea (Warren, 1891)
Orthaga onerata Butler, 1879
Ortholepis atratella (Yamanaka, 1986)
Ortholepis betulae (Goeze, 1778)
Ortholepis nigrisparsella Caradja, 1926
Ortholepis vacciniella (Lienig & Zeller, 1847)
Oxybia transversella (Duponchel, 1836)
Paralipsa gularis (Zeller, 1877)
Paralipsa spoliatrix (Christoph, 1881)
Parasclerobia pimatella (Caradja, 1927)
Patagoniodes nipponella (Ragonot, 1901)
Pempelia albariella (Zeller, 1839)
Pempelia alpigenella (Duponchel, 1836)
Pempelia corticinella (Ragonot, 1887)
Pempelia distinctella Kirpichnikova & Yamanaka, 2002
Pempelia formosa (Haworth, 1811)
Pempelia fraternella (Ragonot, 1887)
Pempelia geminella (Eversmann, 1844)
Pempelia obductella Zeller, 1839
Pempelia palumbella ([Denis & Schiffermüller], 1775)
Pempeliella aurorella (Christoph, 1867)
Pempeliella dilutella ([Denis & Schiffermüller], 1775)
Pempeliella ornatella ([Denis & Schiffermüller], 1775)
Phycita poteriella (Zeller, 1846)
Phycita roborella ([Denis & Schiffermüller], 1775)
Phycitodes albatella (Ragonot, 1887)
Phycitodes binaevella (Hübner, [1813])
Phycitodes crassipunctella (Caradja, 1928)
Phycitodes lacteella (Rothschild, 1915)
Phycitodes maritima (Tengstrom, 1848)
Phycitodes saxicola (Vaughan, 1870)
Phycitodes subcretacella (Ragonot, 1901)
Phycitodes subolivacella (Ragonot, 1901)
Phycitodes triangulella (Ragonot, 1901)
Phycitodes unifasciellus Inoue, 1982
Pima boisduvaliella (Guenée, 1845)
Plodia interpunctella (Hübner, [1813])
Polopeustis altensis (Wocke, 1862)
Polyocha angustatus (Matsumura, 1911)
Polyocha subfasciatella Ragonot, 1887
Pseudacrobasis nankingella Roesler, 1975
Pseudocadra cuprotaeniella (Christoph, 1881)
Pseudocadra obscurella Roesler, 1965
Pseudophycita deformella (Moschler, 1866)
Psorosa dahliella (Treitschke, 1832)
Psorosa decolorella Yamanaka, 1986
Psorosa maraschella Caradja, 1910
Psorosa nucleolella (Moschler, 1866)
Pterothrixidia rufella (Duponchel, 1836)
Pyla fusca (Haworth, 1811)
Pyla manifestella Inoue, 1982
Pyralis farinalis (Linnaeus, 1758)
Pyralis kacheticalis (Christoph, 1893)
Pyralis lienigialis (Zeller, 1843)
Pyralis perversalis (Herrich-Schäffer, 1849)
Pyralis princeps (Butler, 1889)
Pyralis regalis ([Denis & Schiffermüller], 1775)
Quasipuer colon (Christoph, 1881)
Raphimetopus incarnatella (Ragonot, 1887)
Raphimetopus nitidicostella (Ragonot, 1887)
Ratasa noctualis (Eversmann, 1842)
Salebriopsis albicilla (Herrich-Schäffer, 1849)
Salinaria diffusella (Christoph, 1872)
Samoilovia larisa Kirpichnikova, 2001
Samoilovia taisia Kirpichnikova, 2001
Scenedra umbrosalis (Wileman, 1911)
Sciota adelphella (Fischer von Röslerstamm, 1836)
Sciota bicolorella (Leech, 1889)
Sciota confluella (Caradj a, 1916)
Sciota divisella (Duponchel, 1842)
Sciota ferruginella (Zerny, 1914
Sciota fumella (Eversmann, 1844)
Sciota hostilis (Stephens, 1834)
Sciota lucipetella (Jalava, 1978)
Sciota rhenella (Zincken, 1818)
Seeboldia korgosella Ragonot, 1887
Selagia argyrella ([Denis & Schiffermüller], 1775)
Selagia spadicella (Hübner, 1796)
Selagia subochrella (Herrich-Schäffer, 1849)
Selagia uralensis Rebel, 1910
Staudingeria adusrella Ragonot, 1887
Staudingeria aspilatella (Ragonot, 1887)
Staudingeria deserticola (Staudinger, 1870)
Staudingeria gozmanyella Roesler, 1970
Staudingeria morbosella (Staudinger, 1879)
Staudingeria partitella Ragonot, 1887
Staudingeria unicolorella Roesler, 1970
Stemmatophora kaszabi Whalley, 1966
Synaphe amuralis (Hampson, 1900)
Synaphe antennalis (Fabricius, 1794)
Synaphe bombycalis ([Denis & Schiffermüller], 1775)
Synaphe infumatalis Erschoff, 1874
Synaphe moldavica (Esper, 1794)
Synaphe punctalis (Fabricius, 1775)
Teliphasa albifusa (Hampson, 1896)
Teliphasa elegans (Butler, 1881)
Termioptycha inimica (Butler, 1879)
Termioptycha nigrescens (Warren, 1891)
Thospia permixtella Ragonot, 1888
Thospia trifasciella (Ragonot, 1887)
Trachonitis cristella ([Denis & Schiffermüller], 1775)
Trachonitis rufibasella Yamanaka, 1978
Trachycera advenella (Zincken, 1818)
Trachycera dulcella (Zeller, 1848)
Trachycera hollandella Ragonot, 1893
Trachycera legatea (Haworth, 1811)
Trachycera marmorea (Haworth, 1811)
Trachycera niveicinctella Ragonot, 1887
Trachycera suavella (Zincken, 1818)
Vietteia terstrigella (Christoph, 1877)
Vitula biviella (Zeller, 1848)
Zophodia grossulariella (Hübner, [1809])

Crambidae
Acentria ephemerella ([Denis & Schiffermüller], 1775)
Achyra nudalis (Hübner, 1796)
Achyra ustrinalis (Christoph, 1877)
Acropentias aurea (Butler, 1879)
Aeschremon disparalis (Herrich-Schäffer, 1851)
Agriphila aeneociliella (Eversmann, 1844)
Agriphila biarmica (Tengstrom, 1865)
Agriphila deliella (Hübner, [1813])
Agriphila hungarica (Schmidt, 1909)
Agriphila inquinatella ([Denis & Schiffermüller], 1775)
Agriphila poliella (Treitschke, 1832)
Agriphila sakayehamana (Matsumura, 1925)
Agriphila selasella (Hübner, [1813])
Agriphila straminella ([Denis & Schiffermüller], 1775)
Agriphila tersella (Lederer, 1855)
Agriphila tolli (Błeszyński, 1952)
Agriphila tristella ([Denis & Schiffermüller], 1775)
Agrotera nemoralis (Scopoli, 1763)
Algedonia luctualis (Hübner, 1793)
Algedonia terrealis (Treitschke, 1829)
Amaurophanes stigmosalis (Herrich-Schäffer, 1848)
Ambia colonalis (Bremer, 1864)
Ambia yamanakai Kirpichnikova, 1993
Ametasia ochrofascialis (Christoph, 1882)
Analthes maculalis (Leech, 1889)
Anania albeoverbascalis Yamanaka, 1966
Anania egentalis (Christoph, 1881)
Anania funebris (Strom, 1768)
Anania fuscoverbascalis Mutuura, 1954
Anania verbascalis ([Denis & Schiffermüller], 1775)
Anarpia incertalis (Duponchel, 1832)
Ancylolomia japonica Zeller, 1877
Ancylolomia palpella ([Denis & Schiffermüller], 1775)
Ancylolomia tentaculella (Hübner, 1796)
Angustalius malacellus (Duponchel, 1836)
Anthophilodes conchylialis Christoph, 1872
Anthophilopsis baphialis (Staudinger, 1871)
Anthophilopsis moeschleri (Christoph, 1862)
Aporodes floralis (Hübner, [1809])
Atralata albofascialis (Treitschke, 1829)
Atralata melaleucalis (Eversmann, 1852)
Botyodes diniasalis (Walker, 1859)
Botyodes principalis (Leech, 1889)
Bradina angustalis Yamanaka, 1984
Bradina atopalis (Walker, 1859)
Calamotropha aureliella (Fischer von Ros1erstamm, 1841)
Calamotropha fulvifusalis (Hampson, 1900)
Calamotropha kurentzovi Kirpichnikova, 1982
Calamotropha nigripunctella (Leech, 1889)
Calamotropha okanoi B1eszynski, 1961
Calamotropha paludella (Hübner, [1824])
Camptomastix hisbonalis (Wa1ker, 1859)
Cataclysta lemnata (Linnaeus, 1758)
Catagela subdodatella Inoue, 1982
Catoptria aurora Błeszyński, 1965
Catoptria cabardinica Bolov, 1999
Catoptria caucasica (Alphéraky, 1878)
Catoptria colchicella (Lederer, 1870)
Catoptria conchella ([Denis & Schiffermüller], 1775)
Catoptria daghestanica Błeszyński, 1965
Catoptria falsella ([Denis & Schiffermüller], 1775)
Catoptria fenestratella (Caradja, 1928)
Catoptria fulgidella (Hübner, [1813])
Catoptria furcatella (Zetterstedt, 1839)
Catoptria furciferalis (Hampson, 1900)
Catoptria laevigatella (Lederer, 1870)
Catoptria languidella (Zeller, 1863)
Catoptria lythargyrella (Hübner, 1796)
Catoptria maculalis (Zetterstedt, 1839)
Catoptria margaritella ([Denis & Schiffermüller], 1775)
Catoptria myella (Hübner, 1796)
Catoptria mytilella (Hübner, [1805])
Catoptria permiaca (G.Petersen, 1924)
Catoptria permutatella (Herrich-Schäffer, 1848)
Catoptria persephone Błeszyński, 1965
Catoptria pinella (Linnaeus, 1758)
Catoptria profluxella (Christoph, 1887)
Catoptria spodiella (Rebel, 1916)
Catoptria trichostoma (Christoph, 1858)
Catoptria verella (Zincken, 1817)
Catoptria witimella Błeszyński, 1965
Chabula telphusalis (Wa1ker, 1859)
Chilo christophi Błeszyński, 1965
Chilo hyrax Błeszyński, 1965
Chilo luteellus (Motschulsky, 1866)
Chilo phragmitellus (Hübner, [1805])
Chilo pulverosellus Ragonot, 1895
Chilo suppressalis (Walker, 1863)
Cholius luteolaris (Scopoli, 1772)
Chrysocrambus craterellus (Scopoli, 1763)
Chrysocrambus linetellus (Fabricius, 1781)
Chrysoteuchia argentistriella (Leech, 1889)
Chrysoteuchia culmella (Linnaeus, 1758)
Chrysoteuchia daisetsuzana (Matsumura, 1927)
Chrysoteuchia diplogramma (Zeller, 1863)
Chrysoteuchia distinctella (Leech, 1889)
Chrysoteuchia gregorella B1eszynski, 1965
Chrysoteuchia mandschurica (Christoph, 1881)
Chrysoteuchia picturatella (South, 1901)
Chrysoteuchia porcelanella (Motschu1sky, 1860)
Chrysoteuchia pseudodiplogramma (Okano, 1962)
Chrysoteuchia pyraustoides (Erschoff, 1877)
Circobotys heterogenalis (Bremer, 1864)
Circobotys nycterina Butler, 1879
Clasperia ophialis (Treitschke, 1829)
Cleptotypodes ledereri (Staudinger, 1870)
Clupeosoma cinereum (Warren, 1892)
Clupeosoma pryeri (Butler, 1881)
Cnaphalocrocis medinalis (Guenée, 1854)
Cotachena pubescens (Warren, 1892)
Crambus alexandrus Kirpichnikova, 1979
Crambus alienellus (Germar & Kaulfuss, 1817)
Crambus ericellus (Hübner, [1813])
Crambus hamellus (Thunberg, 1788)
Crambus heringiellus (Herrich-Schäffer, 1848)
Crambus humidellus Zeller, 1877
Crambus isshiki Matsumura, 1925
Crambus kindermanni Zeller, 1863
Crambus lathoniellus (Zincken, 1817)
Crambus pascuellus (Linnaeus, 1758)
Crambus perlellus (Scopo1i, 1763)
Crambus pratellus (Linnaeus, 1758)
Crambus pseudargyrophorus Okano, 1960
Crambus sachaensis Ustjuzhanin, 1988
Crambus sibiricus Alphéraky, 1897
Crambus silvellus (Hübner, [1813])
Crambus uliginosellus Zeller, 1850
Cynaeda dentalis ([Denis & Schiffermüller], 1775)
Cynaeda forsteri de Lattin, 1951
Diaphania indica (Saunder, 1851)
Diasemia reticularis (Linnaeus, 1761)
Diasemiopsis ramburialis (Duponchel, 1834)
Diathraustodes amoenialis (Christoph, 1881)
Dolicharthria bruguieralis (Duponchel, 1833)
Dolicharthria punctalis ([Denis & Schiffermüller], 1775)
Donacaula forficella (Thunberg, 1794)
Donacaula mucronella ([Denis & Schiffermüller], 1775)
Donacaula nilotica (Zeller, 1867)
Ebulea crocealis (Hübner, 1796)
Ebulea gracialis Bremer, 1864
Ebulea testacealis (Zeller, 1847)
Ecpyrrhorrhoe rubiginalis (Hübner, 1796)
Elethyia taishanensis (Caradja, 1937)
Elophila fengwhanalis (Pryer, 1877)
Elophila interruptalis (Pryer, 1877)
Elophila nymphaeata (Linnaeus, 1758)
Elophila orientalis (Filipjev, 1934)
Elophila turbata (Butler, 1881)
Epascestria leucalis (Hampson, 1900)
Epascestria pustulalis (Hilbner, [1823])
Ephelis cruentalis (Geyer, 1832)
Euchromius bella (Hübner, 1796)
Euchromius bleszynskiellus Popescu-Gorj, 1964
Euchromius gratiosella (Caradja, 1910)
Euchromius jaxartellus (Erschoff, 1874)
Euchromius mouchai Błeszyński, 1961
Euchromius ocellea (Haworth, 1811)
Euchromius ramburiellus (Duponchel, 1836)
Euchromius rayatellus (Amsel, 1949)
Euchromius superbellus (Zeller, 1849)
Euclasta splendidalis (Herrich-Schäffer, 1848)
Eudonia aequalis Kyrki & Svensson, 1986
Eudonia alpina (Curtis, 1850)
Eudonia delunella (Stainton, 1849)
Eudonia lacustrata (Panzer, 1804)
Eudonia laetella (Zeller, 1846)
Eudonia mercurella (Linnaeus, 1758)
Eudonia murana (Curtis, 1827)
Eudonia pallida (Curtis, 1827)
Eudonia phaeoleuca (Zeller, 1846)
Eudonia puellaris Sasaki, 1991
Eudonia sudetica (Zeller, 1839)
Eudonia truncicolella (Stainton, 1849)
Eudonia vallesialis (Duponchel, 1833)
Eurrhypara hortulata (Linnaeus, 1758)
Eurrhypis cacuminalis (Eversmann, 1843)
Eurrhypis pollinalis ([Denis & Schiffermüller], 1775)
Eurrhypis sartalis (Hübner, [1813])
Evergestis aenealis ([Denis & Schiffermüller], 1775)
Evergestis desertalis (Hübner, [1813])
Evergestis extimalis (Scopoli, 1763)
Evergestis ferrealis (Hampson, 1900)
Evergestis forficalis (Linnaeus, 1758)
Evergestis frumentalis (Linnaeus, 1761)
Evergestis junctalis (Warren, 1892)
Evergestis lichenalis Hampson, 1900
Evergestis limbata (Linnaeus, 1767)
Evergestis manglisalis Erschoff, 1877
Evergestis nomadalis (Lederer, 1872)
Evergestis orientalis Eversmann, 1851
Evergestis pallidata (Hufnagel, 1767)
Evergestis politalis ([Denis & Schiffermüller], 1775)
Evergestis serratalis Staudinger, 1871)
Evergestis sophialis (Fabricius, 1787)
Evergestis sorhageni Sauber, 1899
Evergestis spiniferalis Staudinger, 1900
Evergestis umbrosalis (Fischer von Röslerstamm, 1842)
Flavocrambus picassensis Błeszyński, 1965
Friedlanderia cicatricella (Hübner, [1824])
Gesneria centuriella ([Denis & Schiffermüller], 1775)
Glaucocharis euchromiella (Ragonot, 1895)
Glyphodes perspectalis (Walker, 1859)
Glyphodes pryeri Butler, 1879
Glyphodes pyloalis Walker, 1859
Goniorhynchus explicatalis (Christoph, 1881)
Heliothela wulfeniana (Scopoli, 1763)
Hellula undalis (Fabricius, 1781)
Herpetogramma fuscescens (Warren, 1892)
Herpetogramma luctuosalis (Guenée, 1854)
Herpetogramma magna (Butler, 1879)
Herpetogramma moderatalis (Christoph, 1881)
Herpetogramma phaeopteralis (Guenée, 1854)
Herpetogramma pseudomagna Yamanaka, 1976
Hyperlais dulcinalis (Treitschke, 1835)
Japonichilo bleszynskii Okano, 1962
Kasania arundinalis (Eversmann, 1842)
Krombia bimedia (Filipjev, 1924)
Krombia opistoleuca (FiIipjev, 1924)
Loxostege aeruginalis (Hübner, 1796)
Loxostege clathralis (Hübner, [1813])
Loxostege commixtalis (Walker, 1866)
Loxostege comptalis (Freyer, 1848)
Loxostege concoloralis Lederer, 1857
Loxostege deliblatica Szent-Ivany & Uhrik-Meszaros, 1942
Loxostege ephippialis (Zetterstedt, 1839)
Loxostege expansalis (Eversmann, 1852)
Loxostege manualis (Geyer, 1832)
Loxostege mucosalis (Herrich-Schäffer, 1848)
Loxostege peltalis (Eversmann, 1842)
Loxostege sedakowialis (Eversmann, 1852)
Loxostege sticticalis (Linnaeus, 1761)
Loxostege turbidalis (Treitschke, 1829)
Loxostege virescalis (Guenée, 1854)
Lygropia poltisalis (Walker, 1859)
Mabra charonialis (Walker, 1864)
Marasmia stereogona (Meyrick, 1886)
Maruca testulalis (Geyer, 1832)
Mecyna dissipatalis (Lederer, 1863)
Mecyna flavalis ([Denis & Schiffermüller], 1775)
Mecyna gracilis (Butler, 1879)
Mecyna subsequalis (Herrich-Schäffer, 1851)
Mecyna tricolor (Butler, 1879)
Mecyna trinalis ([Denis & Schiffermüller], 1775)
Mesocrambus candiellus (Herrich-Schäffer, 1848)
Metacrambus carectellus (Zeller, 1847)
Metacrambus jugaraicae Błeszyński, 1965
Metasia suppandalis (Hübner, 1823)
Metaxmeste phrygialis (Hübner, 1796)
Metaxmeste schrankiana (Hochenwarth, 1785)
Microchilo inouei Okano, 1962
Miyakea expansa (Butler, 1881)
Miyakea raddeella (Caradj a, 1910)
Miyakea ussurica Ustjuzhanin & Schouten, 1995
Nacoleia maculalis South, 1901
Nacoleia sorosi Kirpichnikova, 1993
Nacoleiopsis auriceps Matsumura, 1925
Nascia cilialis (Hübner, 1796)
Neoanalthes contortalis (Hampson, 1900)
Neohendecasis apiciferalis (Walker, 1866)
Neopediasia mixtalis (Walker, 1863)
Neoschoenobia testacealis Hampson, 1900
Nomis albopedalis Motschulsky, 1860
Nomophila noctuella ([Denis & Schiffermüller], 1775)
Notarcha basipunctalis (Bremer, 1864)
Notarcha derogata (Fabricius, 1775)
Notarcha doerriesi (Staudinger, 1892)
Nymphula corculina (Butler, 1879)
Nymphula distinctalis (Ragonot, 1894)
Nymphula nitidulata (Hufnagel, 1767)
Nymphula separatalis (Leech, 1889)
Omiodes indicata (Fabricius, 1775)
Omiodes misera (Butler, 1879)
Omiodes sibirialis (Milliere, 1879)
Omiodes tristrialis (Bremer, 1864)
Opsibotys fuscalis ([Denis & Schiffermüller], 1775)
Opsibotys hasanensis Kirpichnikova, 1996
Orenaia alpestralis (Fabricius, 1787)
Orphnophanes turbatalis Christoph, 1881
Ostrinia furnacalis (Guenée, 1854)
Ostrinia kasmirica (Moore, 1888)
Ostrinia kurentzovi Mutuura & Munroe, 1970
Ostrinia latipennis (Warren, 1892)
Ostrinia nubilalis (Hübner, 1796)
Ostrinia orientalis Mutuura & Munroe, 1970
Ostrinia palustralis (Hübner, 1796)
Ostrinia peregrinalis (Eversmann, 1852)
Ostrinia quadripunctalis ([Denis & Schiffermüller], 1775)
Ostrinia sanguinealis (Warren, 1892)
Ostrinia scapulalis (Walker, 1859)
Ostrinia zaguliaevi Mutuura & Munroe, 1970
Ostrinia zealis (Guenée, 1854)
Pachyzancloides sexmaculosus Matsumura, 1925
Palpita nigropunctalis (Bremer, 1864)
Palpita unionalis (Hi1bner, 1796)
Paracorsia repandalis ([Denis & Schiffermüller], 1775)
Paranomis sidemialis Munroe & Mutuura, 1968
Parapoynx nivalis ([Denis & Schiffermüller], 1775)
Parapoynx stratiotata (Linnaeus, 1758)
Parapoynx ussuriensis (Rebel, 1910)
Parapoynx vittalis (Bremer, 1864)
Paratalanta cultralis (Staudinger, 1867)
Paratalanta hyalinalis (Htlbner, 1796)
Paratalanta jessica (Butler, 1878)
Paratalanta pandalis Hübner, [1825]
Paratalanta taiwanensis Yamanaka, 1972
Paratalanta ussurialis (Bremer, 1864)
Pareromene exsectella (Christoph, 1881)
Pediasia altaica (Staudinger, 1900)
Pediasia aridella (Thunberg, 1788)
Pediasia contaminella (Hübner, 1796)
Pediasia epineura (Meyrick, 1883)
Pediasia fascelinella (Hübner, [1813])
Pediasia georgella Kosakevitsh, 1978
Pediasia gregori Roesler, 1975
Pediasia huebneri Błeszyński, 1954
Pediasia jucundella (Herrich-Schäffer, 1847)
Pediasia kuldjaensis (Caradja, 1916)
Pediasia ledereri Błeszyński, 1954
Pediasia luteella ([Denis & Schiffermüller], 1775)
Pediasia matricella (Treitschke, 1832)
Pediasia pectinicornis (Rebel, 1910)
Pediasia pedriolella (Duponchel, 1836)
Pediasia persella (Toll, 1947)
Pediasia pseudopersella Błeszyński, 1959
Pediasia pudibundella (Herrich-Schäffer, 1852)
Pediasia radicivitta (Filipjev, 1927)
Pediasia sajanella (Caradja, 1925)
Pediasia steppicolella (Zerny, 1914)
Pediasia truncatella (Zetterstedt, 1839)
Pediasia zellerella (Staudinger, 1900)
Perinephela lancealis ([Denis & Schiffermüller], 1775)
Phlyctaenia coronata (Hufnagel, 1767)
Phlyctaenia perlucidalis (Hübner, [1809])
Phlyctaenia stachydalis (Germar, 1821)
Piletocera penicillalis (Christoph, 1881)
Piletocera sodalis (Leech, 1889)
Platytes alpinella (Hübner, [1813])
Platytes cerussella ([Denis & Schiffermüller], 1775)
Platytes ornatella (Leech, 1889)
Platytes strigatalis (Hampson, 1900)
Pleuroptya chlorophanta (Butler, 1878)
Pleuroptya deficiens (Moore, 1887)
Pleuroptya expictalis (Christoph, 1881)
Pleuroptya harutai (Inoue, 1955)
Pleuroptya inferior (Hampson, 1898)
Pleuroptya quadrimaculalis (Kollar, 1844)
Pleuroptya ruralis (Scopoli, 1763)
Potamusa midas (Butler, 1881)
Prochoristis capparidis (Christoph, 1877)
Prochoristis rupicapralis (Lederer, 1855)
Prochoristis simplicealis (Bremer, 1864)
Prodasycnemis inornata (Butler, 1879)
Proteurrhypara ocellalis (Warren, 1892)
Psammotis orientalis Munroe & Mutuura, 1968
Psammotis pulveralis (Hübner, 1796)
Pseudebulea fentoni Butler, 1881
Pseudobissetia terrestrella (Christoph, 1885)
Pseudocatharylla inclaralis (Walker, 1863)
Pseudocatharylla simplex (Ze1ler, 1877)
Pycnarmon cribrata (Fabricius, 1794)
Pycnarmon lactiferalis (Walker, 1859)
Pycnarmon pantherata (But1er, 1878)
Pycnarmon tylostegalis (Hampson, 1900)
Pygospila tyres (Cramer, 1789)
Pyrausta aerealis (Hübner, 1793)
Pyrausta aurata (Scopoli, 1763)
Pyrausta caenalis Hampson, 1900
Pyrausta castalis Treitschke, 1829
Pyrausta chrysitis Butler, 1881
Pyrausta chrysopygalis (Staudinger, 1900)
Pyrausta cingulata (Linnaeus, 1758)
Pyrausta clausalis (Christoph, 1881)
Pyrausta curvalis Leech, 1889
Pyrausta despicata (Scopoli, 1763)
Pyrausta elwesi (Staudinger, 1900)
Pyrausta extinctalis (Christoph, 1881)
Pyrausta falcatalis Guenée, 1854
Pyrausta fibulalis (Christoph, 1881)
Pyrausta furvicoloralis Hampson, 1900
Pyrausta fuscobrunnealis (South, 1901)
Pyrausta graeseri (Staudinger, 1892)
Pyrausta limbata (Butler, 1879)
Pyrausta limbopunctalis (Herrich-Schäffer, 1849)
Pyrausta mutuurai Inoue, 1982
Pyrausta nigrata (ScopoIi, 1763)
Pyrausta noctualis Yamanaka, 1978
Pyrausta obfuscata (ScopoIi, 1763)
Pyrausta odontogrammalis Caradja, 1925
Pyrausta ostrinalis (Hübner, 1796)
Pyrausta porphyralis ([Denis & Schiffermüller], 1775)
Pyrausta pseudosanguinalis Kirpichnikova, 1984
Pyrausta pullatalis (Christoph, 1881)
Pyrausta purpuralis (Linnaeus, 1758)
Pyrausta sanguinalis (Linnaeus, 1767)
Pyrausta solemnalis (Christoph, 1881)
Pyrausta tendinosalis Bremer, 1864
Pyrausta tithonialis Zeller, 1872
Reskovitsia alborivulalis (Eversmann, 1843)
Schoenobius gigantellus ([Denis & Schiffermüller], 1775)
Schoenobius sasakii Inoue, 1982
Scirpophaga incertulas (Walker, 1863)
Scirpophaga praelata (Scopoli, 1763)
Scirpophaga xanthopygata Schawerda, 1922
Sclerocona acutellus (Eversmann, 1842)
Scoparia ambigualis (Treitschke, 1829)
Scoparia ancipitella (La Harpe, 1855)
Scoparia basistrigalis Knaggs, 1866
Scoparia conicella (La Harpe, 1863)
Scoparia ingratella (Zeller, 1846)
Scoparia isochroalis Hampson, 1907
Scoparia mandschurica Christoph, 1881
Scoparia manifestella (Herrich-Schäffer, 1848)
Scoparia nipponalis Inoue, 1982
Scoparia perplexella (Zeller, 1839)
Scoparia pyralella ([Denis & Schiffermüller], 1775)
Scoparia subfusca Haworth, 1811
Scoparia x-signata (Filipjev, 1927)
Scoparia yamanakai Inoue, 1982
Sinibotys evenoralis (Walker, 1859)
Sitochroa palealis ([Denis & Schiffermüller], 1775)
Sitochroa umbrosalis (Warren, 1892)
Sitochroa verticalis (Linnaeus, 1758)
Spoladea recurvalis (Fabricius, 1775)
Stiphrometasia monialis (Erschoff, 1872)
Syllepte fuscomarginalis (Leech, 1889)
Syllepte segnalis (Leech, 1889)
Tabidia strigiferalis Hampson, 1900
Talanga quadrimaculalis (Bremer & Grey, 1853)
Talis chamylella Staudinger, 1900
Talis evidens Kosakevitsh, 1979
Talis menetriesi Hampson, 1900
Talis mongolica Błeszyński, 1965
Talis povolnyi Roesler, 1975
Talis pulcherrimus (Staudinger, 1870)
Talis quercella ([Denis & Schiffermüller], 1775)
Talis wockei Filipjev, 1929
Tegostoma comparalis (Hübner, 1796)
Tenerobotys teneralis (Caradja, 1939)
Thisanotia chrysonuchella (Scopoli, 1763)
Thopeutis galleriellus (Ragonot, 1892)
Titanio normalis (Hllbner, 1796)
Titanio originalis (Herrich-Schäffer, 1860)
Trichophysetis cretacea (Butler, 1879)
Trichophysetis rufoterminalis (Christoph, 1881)
Udea accolalis (Zeller, 1867)
Udea affinialis (Zerny, 1914)
Udea alaskalis (Gibson, 1920)
Udea alpinalis (Denis & Schiffermüller, 1775)
Udea austriacalis (Herrich-Schäffer, 1851)
Udea bipunctalis (Herrich-Schäffer, 1851)
Udea caliginosalis (Ragonot, 1894)
Udea costalis (Eversmann, 1852)
Udea cretacea (Filipjev, 1925)
Udea cyanalis (La Harpe, 1855)
Udea decrepitalis (Herrich-Schäffer, 1848)
Udea elutalis (Denis & Schiffermüller), 1775)
Udea exigualis (Wileman, 1911)
Udea ferrugalis (Hübner, 1796)
Udea fimbriatralis (Duponche1, 1834)
Udea fulvalis (Hübner, 1809)
Udea hamalis (Thunberg, 1788)
Udea inquinatalis (Lienig & Zeller, 1846)
Udea institalis (Hübner, [1819])
Udea itysalis Walker, 1859
Udea kusnezovi Sinev, 2008
Udea languidalis (Eversmann, 1842)
Udea latipennalis (Caradja, 1928)
Udea lugubralis Leech, 1889
Udea lutealis (Hübner, [1809])
Udea nebulalis (Hübner, 1796)
Udea ochreocapitalis (Ragonot, 1894)
Udea olivalis ([Denis & Schiffermüller], 1775)
Udea orbicentralis (Christoph, 1881)
Udea prunalis ([Denis & Schiffermüller], 1775)
Udea rhabdalis Hampson, 1900
Udea stationalis Yamanaka, 1988
Udea stigmatalis (Wileman, 1911)
Udea sviridovi Bolshakov, 2002
Udea torvalis Moschler, 1864
Udea tritalis (Christoph, 1881)
Udea uliginosalis (Stephens, 1834)
Udea washingtonalis Grote, 1881
Udonomeiga vicinalis (South, 1901)
Uresiphita gilvata (Fabricius, 1794)
Xanthocrambus argentarius (Staudinger, 1867)
Xanthocrambus delicatellus (Zeller, 1863)
Xanthocrambus lucellus (Herrich-Schäffer, 1848)
Xanthocrambus saxonellus (Zincken, 1821)
Xanthopsamma aurantialis Munroe & Mutuura, 1968

Cimelioidea

Cimeliidae
Axia olga (Staudinger, 1899)

Calliduloidae

Callidulidae
Pterodecta felderi (Bremer, 1864)

Drepanoidea

Epicopeiidae
Epicopeia mencia Moore, 1874
Nossa palaearctica (Staudinger, 1887)

Thyatiridae
Achlya flavicornis (Linnaeus, 1758)
Achlya hoerburgeri (Schawerda, 1924)
Achlya longipennis Inoue, 1972
Epipsestis nikkoensis (Matsumura, 1921)
Epipsestis obscurata Tshistjakov, [1988]
Epipsestis ornata (Leech, [1889])
Epipsestis perornata Inoue, 1972
Habrosyne dieckmanni (Graeser, 1888)
Habrosyne intermedia (Bremer, 1864)
Habrosyne pyritoides (Hufnagel, 1766)
Macrothyatira flavida (Butler, 1885)
Neodaruma tamanuki Matsumura, 1933
Neoploca arctipennis (Butler, 1878)
Nothoploca nigripunctata (Warren, 1915)
Ochropacha duplaris (Linnaeus, 1761)
Parapsestis argenteopicta (Oberthiir, 1879)
Polyploca ridens (Fabricius, 1787)
Shinploca shini Kim Sung Soo, 1985
Tethea albicostata (Bremer, 1861)
Tethea ampliata (Butler, 1878)
Tethea consimilis (Warren, 1912)
Tethea octogesima (Butler, 1878)
Tethea ocularis (Linnaeus, 1767)
Tethea or ([Denis & Schiffermüller], 1775)
Tethea trifolium (Alphéraky, 1895)
Tetheella fluctuosa (Hübner, [1803])
Thyatira batis (Linnaeus, 1758)
Togaria suzukiana Matsumura, 1921
Togaria tancrei (Graeser, 1888)

Drepanidae
Agnidra scabiosa (Butler, 1877)
Auzata superba (Butler, 1878)
Callidrepana palleola (Motschulsky, 1866)
Cilix asiatica Bang-Haas, 1907
Cilix filipjevi Kardakoff, 1928
Cilix glaucata (Scopoli, 1763)
Ditrigona komarovi (Kurentzov, 1935)
Drepana curvatula (Borkhausen, 1790)
Drepana falcataria (Linnaeus, 1758)
Falcaria lacertinaria (Linnaeus, 1758)
Nordstromia grisearia (Staudinger, 1892)
Nordstromia japonica (Moore, 1877)
Oreta pulchripes Butler, 1877
Pseudalbara parvula (Leech, 1890)
Sabra harpagula (Esper, [1786])
Watsonalla binaria (Hufnagel, 1767)

References 

Moths